Abou Mangué Camara (born 30 April 1996) is a Guinean footballer who plays as a right-back for Horoya and the Guinea national team.

International career
Camara made his debut with the Guinea national team in a 1–0 2020 African Nations Championship qualification loss to Liberia on 21 September 2019.

Personal life
Besides his footballing career, Camara founded an orphanage Sonfonia, Ratoma that he has run since 2012. He is a graduate of Philosophy from the University of Sonfonia.

References

External links
 
 

1996 births
Living people
People from Fria
Guinean footballers
Guinea international footballers
Association football defenders
Horoya AC players
Guinée Championnat National players
Guinea A' international footballers
2020 African Nations Championship players